Ursicinus, a Latin name derived from Ursus 'bear', can refer to: 

Antipope Ursicinus (or Ursinus)
Saint Ursicinus (disambiguation) (several saints in Italy and elsewhere)
 Ursicinus (magister equitum), a Roman general of the fourth century
 Ursicinus (king) (4th century), an Alemannic petty king 
Ursicinus (Bishop of Ravenna) (6th century), who ordered the Basilica of Sant'Apollinare in Classe built.